Living with Lions may refer to:
 Living with Lions (film), 1997 documentary
 Living with Lions (band)